Roe Glacier is a tributary glacier, 10 nautical miles (18 km) long, flowing northwest through the Tapley Mountains to enter Scott Glacier just south of Mount Durham. Mapped by United States Geological Survey (USGS) from surveys and U.S. Navy air photos, 1960–64. Named by Advisory Committee on Antarctic Names (US-ACAN) for Derrell M. Roe, a member of summer parties at McMurdo Station in 1963-64 and 1964–65 and station engineer with the McMurdo winter party in 1966.
 

Glaciers of the Ross Dependency
Gould Coast